Stephanopogon is a genus of flagellated marine protist that superficially resembles a ciliate.

Characteristics
Stephanopogon closely resembles certain ciliates and was originally classified with them (but is now considered related to heterolobosean flagellates.  The cell is somewhat flattened, with multiple smooth flagella arranged in rows running from the front to the back, and has an anterior mouth supported by rods.  They feed on bacteria, diatoms, and other smaller organisms.  There are 2-16 nuclei, but they are not differentiated into macronuclei and micronuclei as occurs in ciliates. They have a cosmopolitan distribution.

Classification
Because nuclear dimorphism is absent, Stephanopogon had been regarded as an evolutionary intermediate between the ciliates and other protozoa, and possibly an ancestor of the animals as well.  Corliss and Lipscomb showed that it is not cytologically similar to ciliates, lacking their complex pellicle and infraciliature. Further electron microscopical studies added details to the understanding of the cytological organization of Stephanopogon.  Yubuki and Leander demonstrated that Stephanopogon is closely related to Percolomonas within the Heterolobosea. The  bases of the flagella in both genera are attached to an electron dense cytoskeletal material, but it has been argued that this is not an apomorphy of the clade 

It has recently been included as a heterolosean in the class Percolatea, along with Percolomonas.

The genus contains 7 species: S. apogon Borror, 1965, S. colpoda Entz, 1884, S. mesnili Lwoff, 1923, S. minuta Lei et al., 1999, S. mobilensis Jones et Owen, 1974, S. paramesnili Lei et al., 1999 and S. pattersoni Lee et al., 2014

References

External links
Tree of Life: Stephanopogon

Flagellates
Percolozoa
Excavata genera